TrackMania DS is a racing video game developed by Firebrand Games. It was published by Focus Home Interactive in Europe and released for the Nintendo DS on November 14, 2008, and in the United States by Atlus on March 17, 2009. The game received generally favorable reviews from critics.

Gameplay 
TrackMania DS features gameplay similar to that of the other titles in the TrackMania series and also features a comprehensive track editor. It supports single-player and multiplayer play and contains more than 100 tracks and three game modes ("Race", "Platform" and "Puzzle"). Of the seven environments available in the PC version only three are featured in the DS version: "Rally", "Desert" and "Stadium". With TrackMania DS, players can share tracks with other game owners, but there is no online connectivity.

Reception 
The game received an aggregate score of 75/100 on Metacritic.

References 

2008 video games
Nintendo DS-only games
Racing video games
TrackMania
Atlus games
Focus Entertainment games
Multiplayer and single-player video games
Video games developed in the United Kingdom
Video games scored by Allister Brimble
Nintendo DS games
Firebrand Games games